Sergio Casal and Emilio Sánchez were the defending champions, but lost in the semifinals this year.

Paul Haarhuis and Mark Koevermans won in the final 6–3, 6–3, against Tom Nijssen and Cyril Suk.

Seeds

  Sergio Casal /  Emilio Sánchez (semifinals)
  Omar Camporese /  Javier Sánchez (first round)
  Paul Haarhuis /  Mark Koevermans (champions)
  Karel Nováček /  Tomáš Šmíd (quarterfinals)

Draw

Draw

External links
 Main draw

Men's Doubles